George French  was a Scottish footballer who played as a centre forward, primarily for Morton. He is one of the club's all-time leading scorers, with 127 goals from 199 appearances in the Scottish Football League (all in its top division) and Scottish Cup. He played a major role in Morton's run to the 1922 Scottish Cup Final, but was unable to play in the match due to injury.

French was selected for the Scottish Football League XI on three occasions.

References

Year of birth unknown
Year of death unknown
Association football forwards
Scottish Football League players
Scottish footballers
Greenock Morton F.C. players
Arthurlie F.C. players
Scottish Football League representative players